Queen (iKumkanikazi) Noloyiso Sandile (born: Nomusa kaBhekuzulu Zulu; 24 July 1963 – 8 July 2020) was a South African Royal.

Biography

Early life 
Princess Nomusa kaBhekuzulu was the daughter of the then Zulu King Cyprian Bhekuzulu kaSolomon and one of his wives, Mavis Zungu, popularly known as Ndlunkulu Gwabini. Her siblings among others include, King Goodwill Zwelithini kaBhekuzulu, Prince Mbonisi, and Princess Thembi kaBhekuzulu Ndlovu.

Nomusa attended  Star of the Sea High School and furthered her studies at KwaGqikazi College of Education.

Marriage and Regency 
In 1988, Nomusa married the  Royal House of the AmaRharhabe Monarch Maxhob'ayakhawuleza Sandile.The Sandile family and nation of  AmaRharhabe honored her with the name Noloyiso, as she undertook royal duties serving as queen consort. The couple had two children, Princess NomaRharhabe (born;1990) and King Jonguxolo Sandile (born;1992).

Following the death of her husband in 2011, Noloyiso was appointed as Queen Regent and interim ruler of the  AmaRharhabe Kingdom, a position she held until her death in 2020.

Death 
Sandile died in Mdantsane on 8 July 2020 due to COVID-19 related complications during the COVID-19 pandemic in South Africa. The spokesperson of AmaRharhabe, Prince Zolile Burns-Ncamashe issued a statement confirming ukukhothama  of the Queen.

References

1963 births
2020 deaths
Zulu people
South African women
Zululand District Municipality
Deaths from the COVID-19 pandemic in South Africa